Surinamese people in the Netherlands are people in the Netherlands who come from a Surinamese background. From 1667 to 1975, Suriname was a colony of the Netherlands. 

Migration began during the colonial era. Initially this was mainly the colonial elite but expanded during the 1920s and 1930s to the less fortunate inhabitants looking for better education, employment or other opportunities.

The choice of becoming Surinamese or Dutch citizens in the years leading up to Suriname's independence in 1975 led to a mass migration to the Netherlands. This migration continued in the period immediately after independence and during military rule in the 1980s and for largely economic reasons extended throughout the 1990s. The Surinamese community in the Netherlands numbered 350,300 . Most have a Dutch passport and the majority have been successfully integrated into Dutch society.

Notable individuals

See also 
 Netherlands–Suriname relations
 Surinamese people

References 

Ethnic groups in the Netherlands
Netherlands